National Highway 50 (NH 50) is a primary national highway in India. It traverses the states of Maharashtra and Karnataka.

Route
NH 50
 Nanded
 Loha
 Kandhar
 Jamb bk Jalkot
 Udgir
 Bidar
 Humnabad
 Kalaburagi
 Jevargi
 Sindagi
 Bijapur
 Managuli
 Nidagundi
 Hunagunda
 Ilkal
 Kushtagi
 Hosapete
 Kudligi
 Jagalur
 Chitradurga

Junctions  

  Terminal near Nanded.
  near Loha
  Terminal near Udgir.
  Terminal near Humnabad.
  Terminal near Kalaburgi.
  Terminal near Jevargi.
  Terminal near Vijayapura. 
  Terminal near Hospet.
  Terminal near Chitradurga.

See also 
 List of National Highways in India by highway number
 List of National Highways in India by state

References

External links 
 NH 50 on OpenStreetMap

National highways in India
50
50
Transport in Bijapur, Karnataka
Transport in Chitradurga district